Roy Rowland may refer to:

 J. Roy Rowland (1926–2022),American physician and politician from Georgia
 Roy Rowland (film director) (1910–1995), American film director